Meizodon is a genus of snakes in the subfamily Colubrinae of the family Colubridae. The genus Meizodon contains five species, all of which are poorly known and are endemic to Sub-Saharan Africa.

Species list
Meizodon coronatus 
Meizodon krameri 
Meizodon plumbiceps 
Meizodon regularis 
Meizodon semiornatus 

Nota bene: A binomial authority in parentheses indicates that the species was originally described in a genus other than Meizodon.

Etymology
The specific name, krameri, is in honor of Swiss herpetologist Eugen Kramer (1921-2004).

References

Further reading
Branch, Bill (2004). Field Guide to Snakes and other Reptiles of Southern Africa. Third Revised edition, Second impression. Sanibel Island, Florida: Ralph Curtis Books. 399 pp. . (Genus Meizodon, p. 93).
Fischer JG (1856). "Neue Schlangen des Hamburgischen Naturhistorischen Museums ". Abhandlungen aus dem Gebiete der Naturwissenschaften 3 (4): 79-116. (Meizodon, new genus, p. 112). (in German).

External links
Meizodon at Life is Short, but Snakes are Long
Meizodon at The Reptile Database

Colubrids
Snake genera
Taxa named by Johann Gustav Fischer